Irhuleni (Luwian: Urhilina) was King of Hamath. He led a coalition against the Assyrian expansion under Shalmaneser III, alongside Hadadezer of Damascus. This coalition succeeded in 853 BC in the Battle of Qarqar a victory over the Assyrians, halting their advance to the west for two years. Later Irhuleni maintained good relations with Assyria. His son was, in Luwian, Uratami.

His name also appears in inscriptions on votive offerings found in Nimrud.

King Zakkur is known as the ruler of Hamath around 785 BC.

See also 
 List of Neo-Hittite kings

Bibliography  
 Hawkins,  RLA IV, 67-70. 
 Hawkins,  CAH III.1, 393-396. 
 Klengel, Syria. 3000 to 300 BC, Berlin 1992, 213

References

9th-century BC deaths
9th-century BC rulers
Syro-Hittite kings
Year of birth missing
9th-century BC Aramean kings
Aramean kings